Centro Direzionale will be a station on line 1 of the Naples Metro, adjacent and connected through an underground passage to the Naples Centro Direzionale station of the Circumvesuviana railway. The construction site was inaugurated on 2 August 2014.

The Centro Direzionale station, designed by the EMBT studio (founded by architects Enric Miralles and Benedetta Tagliabue), will serve the business center of Naples, home to numerous public offices.

The external part of the railway complex will occupy a central area of the island F, and will consist of a "wave" canopy:

Interchanges 
The station will have:

  Bus stop

References

External links 

 Official site on metropolitanadinapoli.it

Naples Metro stations
Railway stations in Italy opened in the 21st century